The Douala Stock Exchange (DSX in abbreviation) is the official market for securities in Cameroon.  It is located in Douala.

History 

The origin of the market in Douala began in a project sponsored by CEMAC having to do with creating stock exchanges in Gabon and Cameroon.  CEMAC is the abbreviation for Economic and Monetary Community of Central Africa.

The Douala Stock Exchange was created in December 2001.

DSX is owned by Association professionnelle des établissements de crédit du Cameroun (APECCAM), (Credit Association of Cameroon); by Cameroonian corporate interests; and by the government.  It is similarly governed:

Administration Board:
 APECCAM  : 7 seats
 Corporate : 2 seats
 Government : 1 seat
 Other : 1 seat

Until 2006, the sole listing was (SEMC).

See also
Economy of Cameroon
List of African stock exchanges

References

External links
 

Economy of Cameroon
Financial services companies of Cameroon
Stock exchanges in Africa
Companies based in Douala
Buildings and structures in Douala
Financial services companies established in 2001
2001 establishments in Cameroon